Katherine Gili is a British sculptor. Born in Oxford in 1948, is the daughter of Catalan publisher and translator Joan Gili and sister of the film-maker Jonathan Gili. She graduated from Bath Academy of Art in 1970 and then studied for two years at St Martin's School of Art. Gili subsequently taught at a number of art schools; most notably St Martin's and Norwich between 1972 and 1985.
 
Her sculpture was exhibited for the first time in 1973 and well over a hundred times since. Gili's career is marked by solo shows in London and New York and by contributions to seminal survey exhibitions at major venues such as the Hayward Gallery. In recent years she has regularly shown in the Royal Academy Summer Exhibitions and notably in 2013 her sculpture "Ripoll" won the Sculpture Prize.

Katherine Gili's work is represented in the Arts Council Collection, Tate and other public and corporate collections in the UK, Switzerland and the USA. Lord Foster selected one of her pieces to stand alongside the Cranfield University Institute of Technology Library which was designed by Foster Associates in 1992.

Solo exhibitions 
 Summer Exhibition 2, Selected by Tim Hilton. Serpentine Gallery, Kensington Gardens, London, 1977
 Salander O’Reilly Gallery, New York 1981
 Katherine Gili – A Career Survey; Poussin Gallery 2011
 Artist of the Day, chosen by Jennifer Durrant, Flowers Gallery, London 2014
 Looking for the Physical, Sculpture and Drawings by Katherine Gili, Felix & Spear, London, 2016
 Discovered in the Making, Katherine Gili Sculpture, Felix & Spear, London, 2018
 Sparks Fly, Katherine Gili Sculpture 1974 to 2018, One Canada Square, Canary Wharf, London, 2019

Selected mixed exhibitions 
 The Condition of Sculpture; Hayward Gallery, an international exhibition selected by William Tucker, 1975
 Silver Jubilee Exhibition of Contemporary British Sculpture; Battersea Park 1977
 Annual Stockwell Depot Exhibitions of Painting and Sculpture; 1974–79
 Hayward Annual; 1979
 Have You Seen Sculpture from the Body? Tate Gallery 1984
 Escultura Nueva Reino Unido; Centro Cultural del Conde Duque, Madrid 1988
 Moving Into View: a major display of the Arts Council Collection; South Bank Centre selected by William Packer, 1993
 British Abstract Art, Part 2, Sculpture; Flowers East Gallery, London 1995
 British Figurative Art, Part 2, Sculpture; Flowers East Gallery, London. 1998
 Steel; Canary Wharf, London. 2006
 The Royal Academy Summer Shows 1996, 1997, 2009, 2013, 2014, 2015, 2016

Awards 
 Elephant Trust 1994
 Elected Fellow of the Royal British Society of Sculptors 1999
 Jack Goldhill Award for Sculpture, Royal Academy 2013

Selected Public Collections 
 Arts Council Collection
 University of Leicester
 City of Lugano Switzerland
 Cartwright Hall, Bradford
 General Electric Corporation, USA
 Henry Moore Institute
 Tate

Private collections 

The Leo and Eileen Herzel Collection USA

Lord Peter Palumbo collection at Kentuck Knob USA, a house designed by Frank Lloyd Wright

References 

 Katherine Gili, Looking for the Physical, published by Felix & Spear Gallery, 
 Katherine Gili, a career survey, published by Poussin Gallery, 
 A Free Hand, An exhibition chosen by William Packer from painting and sculpture recently acquired by the Arts Council of Great Britain, 1978, (illus) 
 Stockwell Depot 1967–79 by Sam Cornish, published by Ridinghouse, London, 2015, 
 Forja by José Antonio Ares, published by Parramon, 2007 (illus). 
 La Sculpture en Acier by Philippe Clérin, published by Dessain et Tolra, Paris, 1994 (illus). 
 Portrait of the Artist: 25 Years of British Art by Jorge Lewinski, published by Carcanet, 1987, Katherine Gili, pp70–71 (illus). 
 Interesting Times by Tom Flynn, catalogue for the annual Sculpture in the Garden exhibition, University of Leicester, 2012 (illus)
 Fe2O5, introduction by Ann Elliott, Myles Meehan Gallery, 2005 (illus). 
 British Figurative Art Part Two: Sculpture, introduction by Norbert Lynton, photography by Adrian Flowers, Flowers East Gallery, 1998 (illus).  (paper)
 British Abstract Art Part 2: Sculpture, introduction by Bryan Robertson, Flowers East Gallery, 1995 (illus) 
 A Conversation with Isabel Langtry catalogue for Escultura Nueva Reino Unido, Centro Cultural del Conde Duque, pp47–63, 1988 (illus). 
 Have You Seen Sculpture from the Body? by Vivien Knight, introduction, Tate Gallery, pp8–21, 1984 (illus) 
 Sculpture from Stockwell Depot at the Sainsbury Centre by James Faure-Walker, Artscribe No 35 pp8–21, June 1982 (illus) , 
 Sculpture from Stockwell Depot John Foster, Katherine Gili, Peter Hide, Anthony Smart: Katherine Gili and Anthony Smart by Alan Gouk, Sainsbury Centre for Visual Arts, 1982 (illus) 
 Constructed Sculpture by Brendon Prendeville, catalogue for British Sculpture in the Twentieth Century at Whitechapel Gallery, 1981 pp209–221, (illus) 
 Five Interviews: Katherine Gili with David Robson, (catalogue for the Hayward Annual 1979), Hayward Gallery, 1979, pp116–117, 124–125,(illus) 
 The Condition of Sculpture Hayward Gallery, introduction by William Tucker, 1975 (illus pp26–27) 
 Arts Council Collection (1942–78) (illus p 105) 
 Arts Council Collections 1979–83 (illus p 45)

External links 

 Katherine Gili's Website
 Felix & Spear, London
 Katherine Gili – FAD Magazine
 Papers of Katherine Gili – Archives Hub

1948 births
Living people
20th-century British sculptors
20th-century English women artists
21st-century British sculptors
21st-century English women artists
Alumni of Bath School of Art and Design
Alumni of Saint Martin's School of Art
Artists from Oxford
English women sculptors